Santa Cruz (Catamarca) is a village and municipality in Catamarca Province of Argentina.

References

Populated places in Catamarca Province